Just for the Record is the ninth solo studio album by American country music singer, Barbara Mandrell, released in August 1979.

Mandrell's career was beginning to reach its peak with the end of the 1970s. As such, her sound began to change, particularly with this album. Like her previous album Moods, two singles were released from Just for the Record. Both of these singles were Top 5 Country hits. The first single, "Fooled by a Feeling", also peaked on the Billboard Hot 100 and on the Top 30 on the Adult Contemporary charts. The second single, "Years", went to #1, as well as the Top 40 on the Adult Contemporary charts. This exemplified Mandrell's new crossover style. The album was produced by Tom Collins, who helped Mandrell bring out this pop sound onto her albums.

The album also included a cover of a pop tune called "Darlin'", also recorded by Tom Jones.

Just for the Record proved to be very successful, peaking at #9 on the Top Country Albums chart in 1979, as well as reaching #166 on the Billboard 200, her third album to peak on the Billboard 200.

Track listing
All tracks composed by Kye Fleming and Dennis Morgan; except where indicated
"Fooled by a Feeling" 
"Years" 
"My Love Can Do No Wrong" 
"She's Out There Dancin' Alone" (Geoffrey Morgan)
"Selfish" (Geoffrey Morgan)
"Darlin'" (Oscar Stewart Blandamer)
"Using Him to Get To You" 
"Is It Love Yet" 
"It Can Wait" (Ben Peters)
"Love Takes a Long Time to Die" (Geoffrey Morgan)

Personnel
Background Vocals: Lea Jane Berinati, Tom Brannon, Steve Brantley, Thomas Cain, Bruce Dees, Janie Fricke, Rob Galbraith, Hank Martin, Donna Sheridan, Lisa Silver, Karen Taylor, Duane West, Randy Wright
Bass guitar: Mike Leech
Celesta: Tom Collins
Clavinet: Charlie McCoy
Drums: Roger Clark, Larrie Londin, Kenny Malone
Guitar: Pete Bordonali, Jimmy Capps, Bruce Dees
Harmonica: Charlie McCoy
Lead Vocals: Barbara Mandrell
Mandolin: Pete Bordonali
Piano: David Briggs, Bobby Ogdin
Programming: Lee Hargrove
Steel Guitar: John Hughey
Strings: Sheldon Kurland Strings
String Arranger. Mike Leech
Synthesizer: Lee Hargrove, Shane Keister, Bobby Ogdin
Synthesizer Drums: Clyde Brooks

Charts

Weekly charts

Year-end charts

Singles – Billboard (North America)

References

1979 albums
Barbara Mandrell albums
Albums produced by Tom Collins (record producer)
MCA Records albums